Mind uploading, whole brain emulation, or substrate-independent minds, is a use of a computer or another substrate as an emulated human brain. The term "mind transfer" also refers to a hypothetical transfer of a mind from one biological brain to another. Uploaded minds and societies of minds, often in simulated realities, are recurring themes in science-fiction novels and films since the 1950s.

Early and particularly important examples 

A story featuring an artificial brain that replicates the personality of a specific person is "The Infinite Brain" by John Scott Campbell, written under the name John C. Campbell, and published in the May 1930 issue of Science Wonder Stories. The artificial brain is created by an inventor named Anton Des Roubles, who tells the narrator that "I am attempting to construct a mechanism exactly duplicating the mechanical and electrical processes occurring in the human brain and constituting the phenomena known as thought." The narrator later learns that Des Roubles has died, and on visiting his laboratory, finds a machine that can communicate with him via typed messages, and which tells him "I, Anton Des Roubles, am dead—my body is dead—but I still live. I am this machine. These racks of apparatus are my brains, which is thinking even as yours is. Anton Des Roubles is dead but he has built me, his exact mental duplicate, to carry on his life and work." The machine also tells him "He made my brain precisely like his, built three hundred thousand cells for my memory, and filled two hundred thousand of them with his own knowledge. I have his personality; it is my own through a process I will tell you of later. ... I think just as you do. I have a consciousness as have other men." He then explains his discovery that the electrical impulses in the brain create magnetic fields that can be detected by a device he built called a "Telepather", and that "[t]hrough this instrument any one's mental condition can be exactly duplicated." Later, he enlists the narrator's help in constructing a new type of artificial brain that will retain his memories but possess an expanded intellect, though the experiment does not go as planned, as the new intelligence has a radically different personality and soon sets out to conquer the world.

An early story featuring technological transfer of memories and personality from one brain to another is "Intelligence Undying" by Edmond Hamilton, first published in the April 1936 issue of Amazing Stories. In this story, an elderly scientist named John Hanley explains that when humans are first born, "our minds are a blank sheet except for certain reflexes which we all inherit. But from our birth onward, our minds are affected by all about us, our reflexes are conditioned, as the behaviorists say. All we experience is printed on the sheet of our minds. ... Everything a human being learns, therefore, simply establishes new connections between the nerve cells of the brain. ... As I said, a newborn child has no such knowledge connections in his cortex at all—he has not yet formed any. Now if I take that child immediately after birth and establish in his brain exactly the same web of intricate neurone connections I have built up in my own brain, he will have exactly the same mind, memories, knowledge, as I have ... his mind will be exactly identical with my mind!" He then explains he has developed a technique to do just this, saying "I've devised a way to scan my brain's intricate web of neurone connections by electrical impulses, and by means of those impulses to build up an exactly identical web of neurone connections in the infant's brain. Just as a television scanning-disk can break down a complicated picture into impulses that reproduce the picture elsewhere." He adds that the impulses scanning his brain will kill him, but the "counter-impulses" imprinting the same pattern on the baby's brain will not harm him. The story shows the successful transfer of John Hanley's mind to the baby, whom he describes as "John Hanley 2nd", and then skips forward to the year 3144 to depict "John Hanley, 21st" using his advanced technology to become the ruler of the Earth in order to end a war between the two great political powers of the time, and then further ahead to "John Hanley, 416th" helping to evacuate humanity to the planet Mercury in response to the Sun shrinking into a white dwarf. He chooses to remain on Earth awaiting death, so that people would "learn once more to do for themselves, would become again a strong a self-reliant race", with Hanley concluding that he "had been wrong in living as a single super-mind down through the ages. He saw that now, and now he was undoing that wrong."

A story featuring human minds replicated in a computer is the novella Izzard and the Membrane by Walter M. Miller, Jr., first published in May 1951. In this story, an American cyberneticist named Scott MacDonney is captured by Russians and made to work on an advanced computer, Izzard, which they plan to use to coordinate an attack on the United States. He has conversations with Izzard as he works on it, and when he asks it if it is self-aware, it says "answer indeterminate" and then asks "can human individual's self-awareness transor be mechanically duplicated?" MacDonney is unfamiliar with the concept of a self-awareness transor (it is later revealed that this information was loaded into Izzard by a mysterious entity who may nor may not be God), and Izzard defines it by saying "A self-awareness transor is the mathematical function which describes the specific consciousness pattern of one human individual." It is later found that this mathematical function can indeed be duplicated, although not by a detailed scan of the individual's brain as in later notions of mind uploading; instead, Donney just has to describe the individual verbally in sufficient detail, and Izzard uses this information to locate the transor in the appropriate "mathematical region". In Izzard's words, "to duplicate consciousness of deceased, it will be necessary for you to furnish anthropometric and psychic characteristics of the individual. These characteristics will not determine transor, but will only give its general form. Knowing its form, will enable me to sweep my circuit pattern through its mathematical region until the proper transor is reached. At that point, the consciousness will appear among the circuits." Using this method, MacDonney is able to recreate the mind of his dead wife in Izzard's memory, as well as create a virtual duplicate of himself, which seems to have a shared awareness with the biological MacDonney.

In The Altered Ego by Jerry Sohl (1954), a person's mind can be "recorded" and used to create a "restoration" in the event of their death. In a restoration, the person's biological body is repaired and brought back to life, and their memories are restored to the last time that they had their minds recorded (what the story calls a 'brain record'), an early example of a story in which a person can create periodic backups of their own mind which are stored in an artificial medium. The recording process is not described in great detail, but it is mentioned that the recording is used to create a duplicate or "dupe" which is stored in the "restoration bank", and at one point a lecturer says that "The experience of the years, the neurograms, simple memory circuits—neurons, if you wish—stored among these nerve cells, are transferred to the dupe, a group of more than ten billion molecules in colloidal suspension. They are charged much as you would charge the plates of a battery, the small neuroelectrical impulses emanating from your brain during the recording session being duplicated on the molecular structure in the solution." During restoration, they take the dupe and "infuse it into an empty brain", and the plot turns on the fact that it is possible to install one person's dupe in the body of a completely different person.

An early example featuring uploaded minds in robotic bodies can be found in Frederik Pohl's story "The Tunnel Under the World" from 1955. In this story, the protagonist Guy Burckhardt continually wakes up on the same date from a dream of dying in an explosion. Burckhardt is already familiar with the idea of putting human minds in robotic bodies, since this is what is done with the robot workers at the nearby Contro Chemical factory. As someone has once explained it to him, "each machine was controlled by a sort of computer which reproduced, in its electronic snarl, the actual memory and mind of a human being ... It was only a matter, he said, of transferring a man's habit patterns from brain cells to vacuum-tube cells." Later in the story, Pohl gives some additional description of the procedure: "Take a master petroleum chemist, infinitely skilled in the separation of crude oil into its fractions. Strap him down, probe into his brain with searching electronic needles. The machine scans the patterns of the mind, translates what it sees into charts and sine waves. Impress these same waves on a robot computer and you have your chemist. Or a thousand copies of your chemist, if you wish, with all of his knowledge and skill, and no human limitations at all." After some investigation, Burckhardt learns that his entire town had been killed in a chemical explosion, and the brains of the dead townspeople had been scanned and placed into miniature robotic bodies in a miniature replica of the town (as a character explains to him, 'It's as easy to transfer a pattern from a dead brain as a living one'), so that a businessman named Mr. Dorchin could charge companies to use the townspeople as test subjects for new products and advertisements.

Something close to the notion of mind uploading is very briefly mentioned in Isaac Asimov's 1956 short story The Last Question: "One by one Man fused with AC, each physical body losing its mental identity in a manner that was somehow not a loss but a gain." A more detailed exploration of the idea (and one in which individual identity is preserved, unlike in Asimov's story) can be found in Arthur C. Clarke's novel The City and the Stars, also from 1956 (this novel was a revised and expanded version of Clarke's earlier story Against the Fall of Night, but the earlier version did not contain the elements relating to mind uploading). The story is set in a city named Diaspar one billion years in the future, where the minds of inhabitants are stored as patterns of information in the city's Central Computer in between a series of 1000-year lives in cloned bodies. Various commentators identify this story as one of the first (if not the first) to deal with mind uploading, human–machine synthesis, and computerized immortality.

Another of the "firsts" is the novel Detta är verkligheten (This is reality), 1968, by the renowned philosopher and logician Bertil Mårtensson, a novel in which he describes people living in an uploaded state as a means to control overpopulation. The uploaded people believe that they are "alive", but in reality they are playing elaborate and advanced fantasy games. In a twist at the end, the author changes everything into one of the best "multiverse" ideas of science fiction.

In Robert Silverberg's To Live Again (1969), an entire worldwide economy is built up around the buying and selling of "souls" (personas that have been tape-recorded at six-month intervals), allowing well-heeled consumers the opportunity to spend tens of millions of dollars on a medical treatment that uploads the most recent recordings of archived personalities into the minds of the buyers. Federal law prevents people from buying a "personality recording" unless the possessor first had died; similarly, two or more buyers were not allowed to own a "share" of the persona. In this novel, the personality recording always went to the highest bidder.  However, when one attempted to buy (and therefore possess) too many personalities, there was the risk that one of the personas would wrest control of the body from the possessor.

In the 1982 novel Software, part of the Ware Tetralogy by Rudy Rucker, one of the main characters, Cobb Anderson, has his mind downloaded and his body replaced with an extremely human-like android body. The robots who persuade Anderson into doing this sell the process to him as a way to become immortal.

In William Gibson's award-winning Neuromancer (1984), which popularized the concept of "cyberspace", a hacking tool used by the main character is an artificial infomorph of a notorious cyber-criminal, Dixie Flatline. The infomorph only assists in exchange for the promise that he be deleted after the mission is complete.

The fiction of Greg Egan has explored many of the philosophical, ethical, legal, and identity aspects of mind transfer, as well as the financial and computing aspects (i.e. hardware, software, processing power) of maintaining "copies." In Egan's Permutation City (1994), Diaspora (1997) and Zendegi (2010), "copies" are made by computer simulation of scanned brain physiology. See also Egan's "jewelhead" stories, where the mind is transferred from the organic brain to a small, immortal backup computer at the base of the skull, the organic brain then being surgically removed.

The movie The Matrix is commonly mistaken for a mind uploading movie, but with exception to suggestions in later movies, it is only about virtual reality and simulated reality, since the main character Neo's physical brain still is required for his mind to reside in. The mind (the information content of the brain) is not copied into an emulated brain in a computer. Neo's physical brain is connected into the Matrix via a brain–computer interface. Only the rest of the physical body is simulated. Neo is disconnected from and reconnected to this dreamworld.

James Cameron's 2009 movie Avatar has so far been the commercially most successful example of a work of fiction that features a form of mind uploading. Throughout most of the movie, the hero's mind has not actually been uploaded and transferred to another body, but is simply controlling the body from a distance, a form of telepresence. However, at the end of the movie the hero's mind is uploaded into Eywa, the mind of the planet, and then back into his Avatar body.

Further examples
Mind transfer is a theme in many other works of science fiction in a wide range of media. Specific examples include the following:

Literature
 Frederik Pohl's story The Tunnel under the World (1955). See above article.
 Isaac Asimov's short story The Last Question (1956). See above article.
 Arthur C. Clarke's The City and the Stars (1956). See above article.
 In the Noon Universe created by Arkady and Boris Strugatsky, the Great Encoding of 2121 was the first known attempt to completely store an individual's personality on an artificial medium. The final stages of the Encoding are described in the chapter 14 of Noon: 22nd Century (Candles Before the Control Board), first published in 1961.
 Clifford D. Simak's Hugo-shortlisted novel Time is the Simplest Thing (1961) is based around mind copying and uploading.  The initial swap involves 'the Pinkness' giving 'Shep Blaine' a very large number of minds that it has collected over the aeons in exchange for a copy of his mind.
 Philip José Farmer's World of Tiers series (1965–1993) introduces the villainous Bellers, who were laboratory machines designed to temporarily hold Lord's consciousness between clone bodies, which became sentient and self replicating.onto a Holopox unit shortly before being nuked by the KGB.
 In Roger Zelazny's Lord of Light (1967), the characters can technologically "transmigrate" their minds into new bodies.
 In Arthur C. Clarke's novel 2001: A Space Odyssey (1968), the beings controlling the monoliths were once alien lifeforms that had uploaded their minds into robotic bodies and finally into the fabric of space and time itself. The character Dave Bowman undergoes an uploading from the body of a human into a "ghost", as he is described in later books.
 Bertil Mårtensson's novel Detta är verkligheten (This is reality), 1968. See above article for details.
 Robert Silverberg's novel To Live Again (1969). See opening section for details.
 Gene Wolfe's novella The Fifth Head of Cerberus (1972) features a robot named "Mr. Million" whose mind is an uploaded version of the original man who the narrator ('Number Five') was cloned from, and who acts as the narrator's tutor.
 John Sladek's satirical The Muller-Fokker Effect (1973), in which a human mind could be recorded on cassette tapes and then imprinted on a human body using tailored viruses.
 In an interesting reversal of the typical mind-transfer story, in Robert A Heinlein's Time Enough for Love (1973) a sentient computer transfers "her" mind into a genetically engineered human body.
 In James P. Hogan's The Giants novels (1977–2005), stable FTL travel takes weeks if not months, so people upload their minds into an intergalactic network controlled by the AI known as VISAR. The network also supports a large series of virtual worlds for people to interact.
 Michael Berlyn's The Integrated Man (1980), where a human mind, or part of it (or even just a set of skills) can be encoded on a chip and inserted into a special socket at the base of the brain.
 Rudy Rucker's novel Software (1982). See opening section for details.
 C. J. Cherryh's novel Voyager in Night (1984). An ancient alien vessel uploads various beings that it meets.
 In Heroes Unlimited (1984) under the Robot category, a human pilot has a transferred intelligence category that transfers a human intelligence over a distance into the body of a robot. This option is also available in Rifts Sourcebook 1. In either case it can be permanent.
 William Gibson's novel Neuromancer (1984). See opening section for details.
 Frederik Pohl's novel Heechee Rendezvous (1984) was the first in his Heechee Saga series in which the protagonist Robinette Broadhead had been uploaded into a computer after his death.  The technology was first introduced in Pohl's previous novel in the Gateway tetralogy, Beyond the Blue Event Horizon (1982)
 Larry Niven deals with mind-transfer in his short stories: memories from 'corpsicles' (cryogenically frozen bodies) are transferred to mindwiped criminals. In the novels The Smoke Ring (1987) and The Integral Trees (1984), a human is voluntarily 'translated' into a computer program to operate as a starship's guiding intelligence.
 Iain M. Banks's Culture series (1987–) make extensive reference to the transfer of mind-states.
 Greg Bear's novel Eternity (1988) features a main character discovering a captured uploaded mind of a type of alien called a "Jart", whose civilization is later discovered to have the goal of uploading and digitizing as many minds and life-forms as possible with the hope of preserving them in a future "Final Mind" similar to Teilhard or Tipler's conception of the Omega Point. The story also features Bear's notion of the Taylor algorithms which allow a mentality to discover what type of system it is running on (for example, Bear writes on p. 109 that with these algorithms, "a downloaded mentality could tell whether or not it had been downloaded").
 Janet Asimov's Mind Transfer (1988) journeys through the birth, life, death, and second life of a man whose family pioneers human-to-android mind transfer. It also explores the ethical and moral issues of transferring consciousness into an android at the moment of death, and examines the idea of prematurely activating an android which has not yet accepted a human brain scan.
 Several characters in Kyle Allen's The Archon Conspiracy (1989) are repeatedly killed and resurrected in prosthetic bodies, once a "pattern map" of their brains is recovered and hard-wired into an artificial neural net. The main antagonist uses a similar process to construct a memetic computer virus, in the process uploading the personality of a notorious serial killer into several thousand people.
 Roger MacBride Allen's The Modular Man (1992) portrays the interior experience of a personality copied into a vacuum cleaner and his legal battle for recognition as a legal personality. See also Political ideas in science fiction.
 Peter James' Host (1993). A group of scientists is researching the feasibility of the upload to achieve immortality. Unfortunately it turns out that there are some unforeseen problems with the combination of human emotions and the power to use computers and the internet to manipulate the real world.
 In the novel Feersum Endjinn (1994) by Iain M. Banks, the minds of the dead are uploaded into a computer network known as "the data corpus", "cryptosphere" or simply "crypt", allowing them to be routinely reincarnated. The story revolves around two characters who are trying to reactivate a piece of ancient technology, the "Fearsome Engine", which can prevent the Sun from dimming to the point where life on Earth becomes extinct.
 Greg Egan's novels Permutation City (1994), Diaspora (1997) and Zendegi (2010). See opening section for details.
 In Endgame (1996), the last novel of the Doom series by Dafydd Ab Hugh and Brad Linaweaver, the alien race known as Newbies attempts to transfer Fly Taggart's and Arlene Sanders's souls to a computer simulation based on their memories. However, due to difference between "formats" of human soul and soul of any other being in the galaxy, they accidentally copied their soul, with one copy trapped in the simulation and the other left in their bodies.
 In Garth Nix's Shade's Children (1997), Shade is an uploaded consciousness acting in loco parentis to teenagers to help save them from evil Overlords. Shade contemplates at times how human he is, especially as his personality degenerates during the story; and whether or not he should have a new human body.
 In Charles Platt's novel The Silicon Man (1997), an FBI agent who has stumbled on a top-secret project called LifeScan is destructively uploaded against his will. Realistically describes the constraints of the process and machinery.
 Tad Williams's Otherland series (1998–2002) concerns the activities of a secret society whose goals include creating a virtual reality network where they will be uploaded and in which they will live as gods. Otherland contains a very hard SF approach to the topic, but balances the hard approach with fantastical adventures of the protagonists within the virtual reality network.
 Gene Wolfe's trilogy The Book of the Short Sun (1999–2001) features an old generation starship called the Whorl which is run by a group of uploaded rulers who have set themselves up as gods. Once the Whorl arrives at a star system with habitable planets, they send giant "godlings" to the humans on board to encourage them to depart the ship.
 In Abduction (2000) by Robin Cook, a group of researchers discover an underwater civilization which achieved immortality by transferring their minds into cloned bodies.
 In Alastair Reynolds' Revelation Space universe (2000–), a complete and functioning copy of the mind is described as an alpha-level simulation while a non-sentient copy of the mind based on predictive behavioural pattern of a person's mind is described as a beta-level simulation.
 In Eater (2000) by Gregory Benford, mind-uploading (or consciousness-uploading) is a "demand" of the major antagonist, which is a "magnetic intelligence" (composed of similarly encoded minds) anchored on the event horizon of a black hole. The major character's wife, who is dying of cancer, has her consciousness uploaded into a computer and mounts an attack on the entity, achieving a type of immortality in the process.
 Kiln People (2002) by David Brin postulates a future where people can create clay duplicates of themselves with all their memories up to that time. The duplicates only last 24 hours, and the original can then choose whether or not to upload the ditto's memories back into himself afterward. Most people use dittos to do their work.
 Richard K. Morgan's Altered Carbon (2002) and other Takeshi Kovacs books, where everyone has a "cortical stack" implanted at the base of their skull, soon after being born. The device then records all your memories and experiences in real-time. The stack can be "resleeved" in another body, be it a clone or otherwise, and/or backed up digitally at a remote location.
 Jim Munroe's novel Everyone in Silico (2002) is set in Vancouver in 2036; people can upload to a virtual world called Frisco which is loosely based on the now submerged city of San Francisco.
 Vernor Vinge's novella The Cookie Monster (2003) explores the possibility of mind uploads who are not aware they have been uploaded, and who are kept as unknowing slaves doing technical research in a simulation running at high speed relative to the outside world.
 In Cory Doctorow's Down and Out in the Magic Kingdom (2003), the plot is set in motion when the main character is killed and "restored from backup", a process which entails the creation of a clone and flashing the clone's brain with an image stored on a computer.
 In Carlos Atanes' FAQ: Frequently Asked Questions (2004) the Sisterhood of Metacontrol transfer Angeline's consciousness into the virtual world of the Réseau Céleste.
 Robert J. Sawyer's novel Mindscan (2005) deals with the issue of uploaded consciousness from the perspective of Jake Sullivan: both of them. The human Jake has a rare, life-threatening disease and to extend his life he decides to upload his consciousness into a robotic body; but things don't go quite as planned.
 In the Old Man's War series (2005–) by John Scalzi, the minds of volunteer retirees are transferred to younger, genetically enhanced versions of themselves in order to enable them to fight for the Colonial Defence Forces (CDF). In The Android's Dream, two characters' minds are uploaded onto computers.
 In The Battle of the Labyrinth (2008) by Rick Riordan, Daedalus/Quintus transfers his mind to an automaton by means of a combination of mechanics and magic.
 The book and podcast novel series 7th Son (2009) from JC Hutchins focuses purely on mind uploading and cloning.  Combining two ethically situational sciences and turning it into a thriller series when a terrorist clone can copy his consciousness to other people's minds.
 In Peter F. Hamilton's Void Trilogy (2007–2010) humans are able to upload into the machine intelligence known as ANA. The same theme is found in P F Hamilton's Mindstar Rising (1993) in which an industrialist's mind is also uploaded to a storage device.
 Similar themes are also found in Broken Angels and Altered Carbon by Richard Morgan.
 Hannu Rajaniemi's Quantum Thief series (2010–2014), which includes the novels The Quantum Thief, The Fractal Prince and The Causal Angel, describes a posthuman world where uploaded minds (named gogols) are widely used as intellectual software utilized for various purposes including data analysis, planning and control of embedded systems.
 Clyde Dsouza's Memories with Maya (2013) looks at how deep learning processes, and 'Digital Breadcrumbs' left behind by people (tweets, Facebook updates, blogs) combined with memories of living relatives can be used to re-construct a mind and augment it with narrow AI libraries. The resulting 'Dirrogate' or Digital Surrogate can be thought of as a posthumous mind upload.
 David T. Wolf's novel, "Mindclone," describes the first successful brain scan and upload, creating a digital twin of Marc Gregorio, a science writer. Alternating between the points of view of the human and his digital twin, the novel explores the technology and its consequences as the pair establishes a friendly rivalry, and cooperates to fend off an avaricious government contractor. (2013)
 Damien Boyes's series Lost Time (2015-), features characters whose minds are uploaded and digitally restored into artificial bodies. The series explores the emotional, legal, philosophical, and societal ramifications of mind uploading technology.
 In the novel So Far Out to Sea by Dane St. John (2016), the visionary Abraham Trevis must locate a habitable exoplanet and plot out a journey to get there, in which he plans to use an experimental process called "relocation" to allow humans to survive the inhospitable forces of space and time – it consists of specialized nanotechnology called "architects", engineered for the purpose of replicating neurons and all individual experiences, learnings, and emotional traits.
 In Steve Toutonghi's 2016 novel, Join, people are able to fuse their individual psyches into shared collective consciousnesses—a shared identity known as a join—in order to live multiple lives simultaneously, enjoy perfect companionship, and never die.
 In Adrian Tchaikovsky's novel Children of Time (2016) both Dr. Avrana Kern and Gilgamesh Captain Vrie Guyen experiment with whole brain emulation with varied degrees of success.
 Dennis E. Taylor's Bobiverse series (2016–Present) follows a 21st-century man named Bob whose consciousness has been uploaded and copied into many "replicants". These computerized clones then explore the galaxy while struggling with whether they are still human, or simply machines.
 In Neal Stephenson's Fall; or, Dodge in Hell a software billionaire's brain is destructively scanned and then emulated in a massive cloud computing simulation. The story is told partially in contemporary real space and also in the simulation space which may exhibit different perceived timescales for the simulated consciousnesses.
 Ernest Cline's Ready Player Two (2020) is focused on the OASIS Neural Interface (ONI), a device that connects the user's mind into a virtual reality system by making a complete scan of it prior to use.

Film
 In the film The Creation of the Humanoids (1962), set in the future after a nuclear war, the blue-skinned androids known as "humanoids" are trying to infiltrate human society by creating android replicas of humans that have recently died, using a procedure called a "thalamic transplant" to take the memories and personality of the recently deceased human and place them in the replicas.
In the 1979 film Star Trek: The Motion Picture, the entity that calls itself V'Ger is a heavily modified Earth space probe that is capable of converting lifeforms and objects such as spacecraft into digitized "data patterns", which can then be represented in holographic or even physical form. The best example of this is when a probe from V'Ger kills the Starship Enterprise's navigator, Lieutenant Ilia, and then generates a mechanized duplicate of her to act as its representative to the Enterprise crew. In the film, it is stated that the duplicate is so detailed as to simulate humanoid biological functions, as well as contain the original Ilia's memory patterns, which the crew attempts to uncover in order to better understand V'Ger's motives.
 In the film Tron (1982), human programmer Flynn is digitized by an artificial intelligence called the "Master Control Program", bringing him inside the virtual world of the computer.
 Mamoru Oshii/Masamune Shirow's anime/manga Ghost in the Shell (1989–) portrays a future world in which human beings aggressively mechanize, replacing body and mind with interfacing mechanical/computer/electrical parts, often to the point of complete mechanization/replacement of all original material. Its sequel, Ghost in the Shell 2: Innocence deals heavily with the philosophical ramifications of this problem.
 In the film Robotrix (1991), a criminally insane scientist, Ryuichi Sakamoto, transfers his mind into a cyborg and immediately commits a series of rapes and murders. Among his victims is female police officer Selena Lam. The scientist Dr. Sara transfers Selena's mind into a cyborg named Eve-27, then copies her own persona into a robotic assistant named Ann. The cyborg-robot team pursue the criminal Sakamoto by investigating a series of murdered prostitutes.
 The film The Lawnmower Man (1992) deals with attempts by scientists to boost the intelligence of a man named Jobe using a program of accelerated learning, using nootropic drugs, virtual reality input, and cortex stimulation. After becoming superintelligent, Jobe finds a way to transfer his mind completely into virtual reality, leaving his physical body as a wizened husk.
 The film Freejack (1992) describes a future where the wealthy can seize people out of the past, moments before their death, and transfer their own mind & consciousness to the newly captured body, at the expense of that person's mind. A "freejack" is what an escapee of this process is called. The computer equipment which stores a mind temporarily while it awaits transplant is referred to as "the spiritual switchboard".
 The Thirteenth Floor (1999) is set in late 1990s Los Angeles, where Hannon owns a multibillion-dollar computer enterprise, and is the inventor of a newly completed virtual reality (VR) simulation of 1937 Los Angeles. But Hannon dies and his protégé eventually discovers that the 1990s Los Angeles itself is a simulation.
 In the film The 6th Day (2000), the contents of a brain can be downloaded via the optic nerves, and copied to clones.
 Chrysalis, a 2007 French movie about an experimental machine capable of partially uploading minds. Minds cannot function in purely digital form, they must be placed back into a human container.

 The central conceit of the 2009 science fiction film Avatar is that human consciousness can be used to control genetically grown bodies (Avatars) based on the native inhabitants of an alien world, in order to integrate into their society. This is not true mind uploading, as the humans only control the Avatars remotely (a form of telepresence), but later in the film Grace connects with Eywa (the collective consciousness of the planet) so her mind can be permanently transferred to her Avatar body. Her mind is uploaded to Eywa, but she does not return to her Avatar body and stays within the Tree of Souls. At the end of the film, Jake's mind is uploaded to Eywa and successfully returns to his Avatar body leaving his human body lifeless. The basis for this type of transfer is not explained in detail, but it seems to have a physical basis rather than being something more mystical, given that Grace had earlier described Eywa as a "global network" (like a neural network) made up of electrochemical "connections" (which she said were "like the synapses between neurons") between the roots of trees, and also said that "the Na'vi can access it—they can upload and download data—memories".

 In the 2014 movie Captain America: The Winter Soldier, Arnim Zola, a biochemist for HYDRA developed a terminal disease and he transferred his consciousness to a giant computer that took up the entire area of an old, abandoned S.H.I.E.L.D. facility in New Jersey.
 In the 2014 movie Transcendence, Dr. Will Caster, an artificial intelligence researcher, is assassinated with a bullet laced with radioactive material and has his consciousness uploaded to several quantum processors (and eventually the internet) in order for him to survive in a digital form.
 In the 2015 movie CHAPPiE the title character Chappie transfers the dying Deon's consciousness into a spare robot through a modified neural helmet.
 In the 2015 film Advantageous, Gwen Koh is made to choose between having her consciousness transferred to a different body in order to keep her job as the face of a technology company or not having the resources to give her daughter the education that will maintain her position in a socially and economically stratified society. 
 In the 2015 film Self/less the super wealthy are offered the extension of their lives through the transfer of their minds into what are presented as cloned bodies, but are actually humans whose memories are overwritten and suppressed.
 In the 2018 film Replicas a researcher working on creating synthetic robot brains copies his family's minds into cloned human bodies after they are killed in a car accident, in-order to bring them back to life. However, although their minds are copied into cloned bodies, their minds are first uploaded into storage devices called Mem-Drives capable of storing the entire contents of a human brain, until their minds can then later (only after the cloned bodies that first have to be grown are finished maturing) be transferred subsequently into the cloned human bodies. This film also deals with the concept of Mind uploading (into fully artificial robot bodies) as that is exactly what the primary character in the film is trying to accomplish, from nearly the very beginning of the film.

Television
 In Galaxy Express 999 (1978), people can achieve effective immortality by transferring their minds into android bodies, if they are wealthy enough to afford them. The main character is set on this as his supreme aspiration in life, but slowly comes to appreciate that it is not quite the panacea he had been led to believe it was.
 In the 1985 TV movie Max Headroom and ABC Television series, TV reporter Edison Carter is copied into Network 23's computers creating the TV personality Max Headroom.
 Red Dwarf (1988–1999), where a person's memories and personality can be recorded in just a few seconds and, upon their death, they can be recreated as a holographic simulation. Arnold Rimmer is an example of such a person.
 In Star Trek: The Next Generation season 2 episode 6 "The Schizoid Man" (1989), Dr Ira Graves uploads his mind into Data's positronic brain. He later downloads his memories into the Enterprise's computer, although his personality has been lost. His memories reduced to raw data of events.
 In Star Trek: The Next Generation season 7 episode 10 "Inheritance" (1994), Data encounters his "mother" who unknown to her, had her mind scanned by synaptic scanner by her husband (and Datas "father") Dr Noonien Soong. This was done while she was unconscious, and days before her death an exact copy of her brain was transferred to a positronic matrix, inside a gynoid body (but labeled android body on the show).
 In Battle Angel Alita (1990–, also known as Gunnm), a closely guarded secret of the elite city of Tiphares/Zalem is that its citizens, after being eugenically screened and rigorously tested in a maturity ritual, have their brains scanned, removed and replaced with chips. When this is revealed to a Tipharean/Zalem citizen, the internalized philosophical debate causes most citizens to go insane.
 In the Phantom 2040 TV series (1994–) and videogame (1995), Maxwell Madison Sr., the husband of one of the series' main antagonists Rebecca Madison, is killed during a train wreck with the 23rd Phantom and his brainwaves are uploaded onto a computer mainframe. Rebecca plans to download his brainwaves into a living or artificial body to bring him back to life.
The second of the four TekWar TV movies, titled "TekLords" (1994), featured the uploaded intelligence of a drug lord's sister, who had been killed in an attempt on his life.
The antagonist of the M.A.N.T.I.S. episode "Switches" (1995) is a mad scientist on death row, who has designed a device which will upload his mind into the power grid. The device is activated when the scientist is executed in an electric chair. He is thwarted in his attempt to subject his ex-girlfriend to the same process.
 In Star Trek: Voyager (1995-2001) season 7 episode 7 "Body and Soul" The Doctor had to upload himself into Seven of Nine due to a race who hated photonic life forms.
 In Yu-Gi-Oh! (1996–), Noah Kaiba died in a car accident and his mind was uploaded to a supercomputer.
 In the TV series Stargate SG-1 (1997–2007), the Asgard cheat death by transferring their minds into new clone bodies. The mind of Thor, the high commander of the Asgard fleet, was for a time transferred into the computer of a Goa'uld spaceship. In the episode "Tin Man" (1998), the SG-1 team visit a warehouse of an extinct alien civilization, where the android caretaker scans their minds and builds android duplicates of the team, who are unaware that they aren't the originals until they find their original bodies in suspended animation. In "Holiday" (1999) Dr. Daniel Jackson's mind is transferred into Machello's body and vice versa. In "Entity" (2001) Samantha Carter's mind is transferred into a computer. In "Lifeboat" (2003) around 12 minds are transferred into and then out of Daniel Jackson's body. In the two-part opening of season 8, "New Order" (2004), Jack O'Neill's mind is fully interfaced with the main computer of Thor's ship.
 In the TV series Stargate Atlantis, after being infected with Asuran (Replicator) Nanites, Dr. Weir is capable of accessing and uploading herself in the Asuran collective network.
 In the TV series Stargate Universe, the consciousnesses of a number of deceased characters are uploaded to the Destiny's main computer, where they exist as live computer programs which can interact with the crew via induced audiovisual hallucinations.
 Cowboy Bebop episode 23 "Brain Scratch" (1999) is about a cult dedicated towards electronic transference of the mind into a computer network.
 In the French animated series Code Lyoko (2003–), the primary characters use devices called Scanners that read the entire physical makeup of the user, digitize their atoms and then teleport the user onto the virtual world of Lyoko.
 In the Japanese animated television series Kaiba (2008), memories can be stored as information via a memory chip; when individuals die, their minds live on. This digitization of mental information allows for the transfer of one's mind to someone else's body, and the theft and manipulation of other people's memories has become the norm. Society is largely divided into two classes. In the skies are electrical storms, which cannot be passed through without losing one's memories. Above them lies the realm of the wealthy and powerful, who barter others' bodies and memories for their own enjoyment and longevity. Below the clouds is a troubled and dangerous world where good bodies are hard to come by and real money is scarce.
 In the television series Caprica (2009–2010), a prequel to Battlestar Galactica, the ability to upload human consciousnesses into a virtual reality world is featured prominently. (Battlestar Galactica did not itself feature true mind uploading, since the cylons were artificial intelligences that were not based on ordinary human brains, though their minds could be transferred from one body to another in the same manner as is often envisioned for uploads.) While some characters believe that the process only creates an imperfect copy of the original person, as the death of the original consciousness is unnecessary for the creation of the virtual copy, other characters believe that it can be viewed as a form of religious rebirth analogous to the afterlife.
 Mind transfer is a central theme in the television series Dollhouse (2009–2010).
 In the anime series Serial Experiments Lain, the antagonist Masami Eiri embeds his memories and consciousness into the "Wired", the internet of the story universe. He believed that humanity should evolve by ridding themselves of their physical limitations and live as digital entities only.
 In the second installment of the story The Trial of a Time Lord in the original Doctor Who series, the Doctor's assistant Perpugilliam Brown has her mind erased, and replaced with the mind of the dying Lord Kiv of the Mentors. The storyline mentions that this is the first time the entire mind of an individual can be transplanted from one body to another. It is a pivotal moment in the history of the series as it is the purported reason that the Time Lords took the Doctor out of time and placed him on trial. It was later shown to be false evidence in the Doctor's trial.
 In the episode Silence in the Library of the 2005 revival of the British television show Doctor Who Donna Noble is "saved" by the computer Cal where she joins several others inside the computer that had been saved previously. Arguably the process of saving the individuals is more involved then simple mind uploading as the teleportation patterns of the individuals are also stored and the Doctor is able in the next episode Forest of the Dead to get Cal to return them to the physical world. However, also in Forest of the Dead, the character of River Song, is killed but the doctor is able, using a future Doctor's sonic screwdriver to upload River's consciousness into Cal thus extending her life indefinitely.
 In the episode "13.1" of the show Warehouse 13, former Warehouse Agent Hugo Miller's hologram appears when an attempt is made to upgrade the computer systems inside the Warehouse.  In fear of being deleted during the upgrade, Hugo locks down the entire Warehouse and attempts to kill everyone inside.  Hugo's hologram is later identified as a portion of the agent's mind in which he uploaded onto the Warehouse computers using an artifact, but something went wrong during the transfer and only certain parts of his mind went into the computer, leaving the other parts in Hugo's biological mind.  Having only half of an actual brain renders him insane and he is put into an asylum until he is later retrieved by Pete and Myka to reverse what the artifact has done, thus making him a whole person again and deleting the holographic and homicidal half version of Hugo in the Warehouse 13 computer systems.
 The 2014 episode "White Christmas" of the British TV show Black Mirror features a procedure where copies of living subjects' minds are uploaded to "cookies", devices capable of running full brain emulation, and then used for household control jobs, judicial investigation, and criminal sentencing. An operator can also adjust the cookie speed to make the emulated mind experiment a different time scale, a feature used to apply a thousand-year long sentence to an individual's mind, which is served in a few hours of real-world time.
 In the 2014 episode "Days of Future Future" of the Simpsons, Professor Frink loads Homer's brain onto a USB-Stick and then brings him to life in a digital environment with his head being shown on (the future equivalents of) "TV"-screens, digital photo frames and computer screens between which Homer can move freely and engage in screensavers and video games. Later Bart buys him a "robot body" (similar to the Surrogates in the movie Surrogates) which he plugs into the "TV" upon which it conflates and Homer's head moves from the screen over to the physical robot.
 The 2016 episode San Junipero of the British TV show Black Mirror.
 In Westworld (2016), the eponymous theme park is run with the purpose of digitalizing consciousness in order to achieve immortality. This is done by analyzing the human guests' behaviors and adjusting their digital representation until it reacts in the same way as the guest to any given stimulus.
 In season 3 of The 100 (2014-2020), which aired in 2016, an AI device known as The Flame is introduced. This device requires merging with a human brain, and is passed down (over many years) to each new Commander of the Grounders, aka Heda. Each new Commander has access to (the ability to see and speak to) all of the prior Commanders, as their minds live on after their deaths, due to being uploaded and saved within The Flame.
Altered Carbon (2018) is based on the premise that "More than 300 years in the future, society has been transformed by new technology, leading to human bodies being interchangeable and death no longer being permanent."
In season 6 of The 100 (2014-2020), which aired in 2019, a group of colonists from Earth inhabited an Earthlike planet called Sanctum. They developed the technology to download the human mind to a drive and upload it to another human being. In order to achieve this, they also developed the technology to wipe the mind of a human being while keeping the brain intact. After wiping the mind of the victim, they could then insert the mind drive into the body and upload the consciousness of the downloaded mind, effectively allowing human consciousness to live forever in different bodies.
 In Star Trek: Picard (2020), protagonist Jean-Luc Picard's consciousness is transferred to an android body upon his human body's death. Knowing that Picard would not want to be immortal, creator Altan Intigo Soong and La Sirena crew members Soji Asha and Agnes Jurati deliberately limit his new lifespan to what it would have been without the brain defect that killed him.
Super Sentai
The 2010 instalment Tensou Sentai Goseiger featured the Matrintis leader Robogorg of the 10-sai, who was once a human scientist that transferred his brain into a Matroid body after he was ostracized by his people, ironically saving himself when his civilization perished.
The 2017 instalment Uchu Sentai Kyuranger featured the mad scientist Dr. Anton, who had a dissociative identity disorder, forcing him to transfer his evil self into a receptacle while his good half remains in his human body to defect from the Jark Matter.
 The ultimate main antagonist of Amphibia (2019) is the Core, the product of a group of immortality-seeking Amphibian scientists transferring their minds to a shared consciousness. However, the resulting entity was left inhabiting a large, cumbersome robotic body, resulting in it seeking a far more mobile host, eventually choosing supporting character Marcy Wu due to her genius-level intellect after she won a game of Flipwart against King Andrias Leviathan. After the events of "True Colors", Marcy is held captive in a healing tank until the events of "Olivia & Yunan", at which point the title characters attempt to rescue her but are foiled and ultimately forced to watch as she is taken over by the Core.

 In Upload (TV_series)(2020–) by Greg Daniels, it's 2033. Humans can "upload"  themselves into a virtual afterlife of their choosing, with different "levels" similar to socioeconomic stratum of society and they are cared for by "handlers".  When computer programmer Nathan Brown dies prematurely, he is uploaded to the very expensive Lakeview, but then finds himself under the thumb of his possessive, still-living girlfriend Ingrid. As Nathan adjusts to the pros and cons of digital heaven, he bonds with Nora, his living customer service rep. Nora struggles with the pressures of her job, her dying father who does not want to be uploaded, and her growing feelings for Nathan while slowly coming to believe that Nathan was murdered.

Comics
 In the Marvel Comics universe, Adolf Hitler's mind was transferred into a cloned body upon his death; this clone became the supervillain called the Hate-Monger, first introduced in 1963.
 The 1966 comic book superhero NoMan "was a human mind housed in a robotic body. The mind, that of Anthony Dunn, had been transferred into the robotic form as his human body passed away."
 In the 1990 Japanese manga series Battle Angel Alita, one of the main plot points orbits around the "secret of Tiphares". In the aerial city of Tiphares everyone who turns 19 undergoes an "initiation" to obtain Tipharean citizenship: officially this implies just gaining a small tattoo on the forehead but secretly the Medical Investigation Bureau, which controls the city, has the brain of every initiated person to be mechanically surgically removed and, while their body remained in a temporary suspended animation until the end of the process, transfers the individual's mind along with all his memories and informations in a so-called "brain bio-chip", which mimics every aspect of a human brain, which is then implanted where the brain was.
 In Frank Miller's comic RoboCop Versus The Terminator (1992), the human brain of RoboCop is uploaded into Skynet, the malevolent artificial intelligence from the Terminator series. RoboCop's mind waits hidden inside Skynet for many years until he finally gets an opportunity to strike against it.
 In Journey Into Mystery (2013) The aliens Beta Ray Bill and Ti Asha Ra as well as his ship Skuttlebutt are all representative uploaded entities. Bill is a cyborg and Ti Asha Ra is created from within the Celestial Galactus himself. In issues #652-55, Skuttlebutt is destroyed, and Ti Asha Ra is killed; however, the ship entity Bill had been chasing is a form of cosmic life collector and partitions Ti Asha Ra's mind to upload Skuttlebutt's consciousness into her physical body, apparently resurrecting her from the dead. It also uploads the life goddess Gaea and Ti Asha Ra into itself, which allows the Asgardian warrior maiden Sif and Bill to rescue them later as all is returned to normal.
 In Amazing Spider-Man, Otto Octavius was able to house copy of his mind in a robotic body of the Living Brain. After its destruction, Octavius transferred his mind into a clone body and then, into a new clone body of Spider-Man.
 In DC comics the hero "NoMan" was a 76-year-old man before having his consciousness uploaded.

Video games
 In the computer game Space Quest IV: Roger Wilco and the Time Rippers (1991) from Sierra Entertainment, the hero Roger Wilco is chased through time by an uploaded version of his old enemy Sludge Vohaul, whose consciousness has been stored on the missing floppies from a never-produced fourth installment of the Leisure Suit Larry series (also made by Sierra).
 In Delphine Software's game Flashback (1992), the protagonist Conrad Hart discovers that the Morph alien race is plotting to invade Earth. Knowing that the Morphs will erase his memory if they discover that he knows about them, he copies his memory and records a message of himself in his holocube in case if his memory is erased. 
 In Cyborg Justice (1993), a game for the Sega Genesis, the player is uploaded into a robotic body.
 In the Mega Man X video games (1993–), X's creator Doctor Light had uploaded his brainwaves into a computer before he died, and effectively "lives beyond the grave" as a sentient hologram that can communicate with X and Zero. Additionally, one stage (Cyber Peacock) and the game Mega Man Xtreme involved the protagonists (artificial humans) being uploaded into "cyberspace".
 The computer game Independence War (1997), in which the player is assisted by a recreation of CNV-301 Dreadnoughts former captain, who is bitter about having been recreated without his consent.
 In the computer game Total Annihilation (1997), a multi-millennia galactic war rages between a society demanding mandatory destructive uploading and a rebellion against it.
 In the Japanese release of Ace Combat 3: Electrosphere (1999), the main antagonist is the result of a mind uploading experiment, which is referred to in the game as "sublimation" after the phase transition.
 In the Mega Man Battle Network series (2001–), Hub Hikari, twin brother of protagonist Lan Hikari, was uploaded and configured into the Navi (artificial intelligence) Megaman.EXE to escape a lethal birth defect.
 In Metroid Fusion (2002), Samus Aran's commander and friend Adam had his brain uploaded to the Federation's network, a process that is apparently common for scientists and leaders.
In the video game Doom Eternal, the Seraphim, Samur Maykr, uploaded his consciousness into a cloned body in order to move among the humans more easily as Dr. Samuel Hayden. Samur transferred his consciousness once again, this time into a technological shell of UAC design, enabling him to sidestep ancient laws and enter Hell during the earliest human expeditions. He located and took possession of the Slayer's sarcophagus, knowing he would be key to stopping the coming conflict. After aiding the Slayer in the war against Hell the Seraphim's original body was reclaimed.
 In the MMO Eve Online (2003), players take the role of pilots for hire known as "capsuleers" or "Empyreans". Through usage of capsule technology, they have their minds downloaded and transferred to a new clone through the galactic network at the moment before death. 
 In the RPG game Harbinger (2003) one of the playable characters is uploaded being in a gladiator robotic body, on a generational starship.
 In the computer game City of Heroes (2004–), the arch-villain known as Nemesis was born in Prussia during the 18th century, but has since then put his mind into a complex, steam-powered robotic body. 
 In the video game Jak 3 (2004), the character Vin uploads his mind into a computer before he is killed.
 In the Destroy All Humans! series (2005–), Orthopox 13 uploads a "copy of my [his] exquisite mind" onto a Holopox unit just before his ship is nuked by the KGB.
 In the games Portal and Portal 2, the character GLaDOS is actually Aperture Science's CEO Cave Johnson's assistant Caroline, transferred into a computer. Cave originally opted for himself to be transferred into a computer, but died before it could happen, and hence Caroline was transferred instead. At the end of Portal, GLaDOS also claims to have Chell's brain "scanned and permanently backed up in case something terrible happens".
 In the game Dirge of Cerberus: Final Fantasy VII (2006), the character Professor Hojo is revealed to have uploaded his consciousness into the worldwide network moments before his death in the original Final Fantasy VII (1997) as a means to survive the encounter with the protagonists and ultimately download himself into a new, stronger body 3 years later.
 In the iPhone RPG Chaos Rings (2010), a human named Theia transferred her consciousness and memories into the mainframe of the Ark Arena, a highly advanced spaceship and time travel machine, in order to oversee its activities.
 In Assassin's Creed: Revelations (2011) it turns out that Subject 16 uploaded his mind into the Animus virtual machine shortly before committing suicide in the first game.
 In Watch Dogs: Legion several people had their mind uploaded by one of the antagonists "Skye Larsen", eventually having had part of their consciousness deleted to turn them into AI programmes, such as driving a taxi or managing a house.
 In the game Deponia (2012) the character "Goal" has her personality backed up onto a disc, inserted inside her head.
Cortana from Halo series is based on a cloned brain.
 In Halo 4 (2012), this is the main purpose of the Forerunner device known as the Composer. It digitizes organic intelligences, allowing them to live as AIs. However, the process corrupts the minds that are converted and is irreversible. 
 In Mass Effect 3 (2012), Legion (member of a race of Synthetic Intelligences known as the Geth) temporarily uploads Commander Shepard's consciousness into the Geth Consensus, the network that houses all Geth programs.
 In Crysis 3 (2013) it was revealed that in the time since Crysis 2, the personality of "Alcatraz"—the protagonist of Crysis 2—was effectively supplanted by "Prophets" whose memories and consciousness were embedded in the "nanosuit" that Alcatraz was wearing. 
 In the MMO first-person shooter Dust 514 (2013), mercenary foot soldiers use a device called a Neural Interface System (NIS) implant to transfer conscientiousness to a clone body at the moment of death. 
 In the thriller game Master Reboot (2013) the players' character is uploaded into the "Soul Cloud" upon biological death, where all the data that makes up a persons soul in stored in vast data banks.
 In Warframe (2013), the titular Warframe suits are actually biomechanical shells which are connected the conscience of the actual Tenno, human children who were given unpredictable powers by the Void.
 In the video game Elite: Dangerous (2014) from Frontier Developments, Utopia, one of possible Powerplay factions to be joined by players, was created over idea of preservation of human mind through mind uploading.  
 In the thriller game SOMA (2015).
 In the JRPG "Xenoblade Chronicles X" (2015), where humans who escaped the Earth's destruction had their consciousnesses recorded and stored inside a database where they can control artificial bodies known as Mimeosomes.
 In the Visual Novel Steins;Gate 0 (2015), a main character Makise Kurisu, persists in the form of a digital copy of her brain powered by the experimental program "Amadeus".
 In the RPG game "Cyberpunk 2077" (2020), where the main character steals a chip which stores the consciousness of a terrorist and "rock legend" named Johnny Silverhand. The main plotline also evolves around the concept with a fictional product named "the Relic" allowing a user to create a copy of themselves for their families, this is then stored in a Digital prison named Mikoshi.

Other media
 In the tabletop game Car Wars (1980) characters' bodies are routinely cloned and their stored memories uploaded into the new bodies, which are activated upon the death of the old versions.
 In the Rifts role-playing game Dimension Book 2: Phase World (1994), a member of an artificial race called the Machine People named Annie integrates her consciousness permanently with a spacecraft.
 In the online collaborative world-building project "Orion's Arm" (2000–) the concepts of mind copying and uploading are used extensively, particularly in the e-novel Betrayals.
 The award-winning RPG Transhuman Space (2002) tackles the mind-uploading issue with the concept of xoxing, which is the illegal perfect copy of a mind. Mind emulation (called ghosts) is always destructive, so a living person cannot co-exist with their digital copy. Nevertheless, this doesn't prevent multiple digital versions from being simultaneously active. Law prohibits more than one active copy of a brain emulation or a strong artificial intelligence at a time (security backups being considered inactive), and the RPG delves into the possible abuses of this (like cult leaders implanting a copies of their own minds in every cult followers' neural interfaces).
 The RPG Eclipse Phase takes place in a frightening future after a technological singularity in which a group of superintelligent Seed AIs known as TITANs that were infected by an alien nano-virus forcibly destructively uploaded most humans and transhumans alive at the time and kidnapped their egos (term used for brain emulations in the setting), while destroying the surface in an event called "The Fall". Most of the survivors live in space, and have uploaded their personalities (or "egos") and can regularly switch between physical bodies ("morphs"), or inhabit simulated bodies ("infomorphs") in virtual environments. Duplication of uploaded personalities is also possible ("forking").

See also
 Body swap appearances in media
 Cyborgs in fiction (includes examples of the related notion of placing a biological brain in an artificial body)
 Technologically enabled telepathy
 Whole-body transplants in popular culture

References

External links
 Machine Intelligence List – list of stories with machine intelligences, those marked with "H" include "humans in computerized/program/digitized form"

Science fiction themes